Michal Ivan (born November 18, 1999) is a Slovak professional ice hockey defenceman for HC Bílí Tygři Liberec of the Czech Extraliga (ELH).

He also played in the Quebec Major Junior Hockey League for the Acadie–Bathurst Titan and the Drummondville Voltigeurs. He signed with HC Dynamo Pardubice on June 21, 2019.

International play
He was selected to make his full IIHF international debut, participating for Slovakia in the 2021 IIHF World Championship.

Career statistics

International

Awards and honors

References

External links

1999 births
Living people
Sportspeople from Žiar nad Hronom
Slovak ice hockey defencemen
HKM Zvolen players
Acadie–Bathurst Titan players
Drummondville Voltigeurs players
HC Dynamo Pardubice players
HC Bílí Tygři Liberec players
Slovak expatriate ice hockey players in Canada
Slovak expatriate ice hockey players in the Czech Republic